Tuolumne Peak is a mountain, in Yosemite National Park, in the area of Tuolumne Meadows. It is a fractured granite, twin summited peak, and is close to geographic center of the park. It is climbed less often than Hoffman, probably due to a more difficult approach.

There is rock climbing, on Tuolumne Peak.

Tenaya Glacier had effects, at least near Tuolumne Peak, during the Wisconsin Glacial Stage, over-topping the ridge that connects Tuolumne Peak to Mount Hoffman, isolating both tops.

Climate
Tuolumne Peak is located in an alpine climate zone. Most weather fronts originate in the Pacific Ocean, and travel east toward the Sierra Nevada mountains. As fronts approach, they are forced upward by the peaks (orographic lift), causing them to drop their moisture in the form of rain or snowfall onto the range.

See also
 
 Geology of the Yosemite area
 May Lake

Gallery

References

External links 
 On the first known ascent
 Hiking to Tuolumne Peak
 Peakbagger on Tuolumne Peak

Geology of Yosemite National Park
Mountains of Yosemite National Park
Mountains of Mariposa County, California
Igneous intrusions
Mountains of Northern California
Cretaceous magmatism
Igneous petrology of California
Felsic intrusions